Metee Taweekulkarn (born March 19, 1986) is a retired professional footballer from Thailand.

References

External links
 
 

1986 births
Living people
Metee Taweekulkarn
Metee Taweekulkarn
Association football midfielders
Metee Taweekulkarn
Metee Taweekulkarn